Half a Sixpence is a 1963 musical comedy based on the 1905 novel Kipps by H. G. Wells, with music and lyrics by David Heneker and a book by Beverley Cross. It was written as a vehicle for British pop star Tommy Steele.

Background
The show is based on H.G. Wells's 1905 novel Kipps: The Story of a Simple Soul. Steele played Arthur Kipps, an orphan who unexpectedly inherits a fortune, and climbs the social ladder before losing everything and realizing that you just can't buy happiness.

David Heneker (who had also worked on Irma La Douce and Charlie Girl) wrote both music and lyrics.  Steele's importance to the show was made evident by his appearance in twelve of the musical's fifteen songs. Much of this musical was tailored as a star vehicle for Steele's particular talents. This was especially evident in the musical number "Money to Burn": when Arthur Kipps realises that he is about to become wealthy, he decides that the first thing he will buy is a banjo. This is the cue for someone to hand Tommy Steele a banjo so that he can demonstrate his skill on the instrument. In the source material – Wells's novel – one of the first things that Arthur Kipps purchases with his newfound wealth is a banjo.

John Cleese of Monty Python fame had a small role. While performing in the musical, Cleese met future Python member Terry Gilliam as well as American actress Connie Booth, whom he married on 20 February 1968.

Productions

London
Half a Sixpence was first produced in London's West End at the Cambridge Theatre on 21 March 1963, with Marti Webb, in her first leading role, playing Ann. Anna Barry also appeared as Helen. The production was directed by John Dexter, with choreography by Edmund Balin, and the set was designed by Loudon Sainthill. It ran for 677 performances.

Film version
A 1967 film adaptation starring Steele, along with Julia Foster and Cyril Ritchard, was directed by George Sidney and choreographed by Gillian Lynne. Lesley Judd, a future presenter of the BBC children's TV series Blue Peter, was one of the dancing chorus. Foster's singing voice was dubbed by Marti Webb.

2016 revised version
A revised version of the show opened at the Chichester Festival Theatre to rave reviews and standing ovations in July 2016, co-produced by Cameron Mackintosh. Reuniting Mackintosh's Mary Poppins collaborators, the show features a new book by Julian Fellowes and new songs by George Stiles and Anthony Drewe alongside revisions of Heneker's originals.

Following the success in Chichester, the production transferred to the Noël Coward Theatre in London's West End on 17 November 2016 with previews from 29 October 2016. It initially booked until 11 February 2017. Due to five-star reviews and audience acclaim, the show was extended until 22 April 2017. 
 It was extended, once again, until 6 May 2017. It extended again until 2 September 2017, when it closed.

Songs

 Act I
 "All in The Cause of Economy" – Arthur Kipps, Sid Pornick, Buggins and Pearce
 "Half a Sixpence" – Arthur Kipps and Ann Pornick
 "Money to Burn" – Arthur Kipps, Laura and The Men
 "A Proper Gentleman" – Arthur Kipps, Sid Pornick, Buggins, Pearce and Shopgirls
 "She's Too Far Above Me" – Arthur Kipps
 "If The Rain's Got to Fall" – Arthur Kipps, Pearce, Sid Pornick, Buggins, Shopgirls, Singers and Dancers
 "The Old Military Canal" – Singers

 Act II
 "A Proper Gentleman" (Reprise) – Arthur Kipps, Mrs. Walsingham, Helen Walsingham, Mrs. Botting, Young Walsingham and Party Guests
 "The One That's Run Away" – Chitterlow & Kipps
 "Long Ago" – Arthur Kipps and Ann Pornick
 "Flash Bang Wallop" – Arthur Kipps, Ann Pornick, Chitterlow, Mr. Shalford, Pearce, Sid Pornick, Buggins, Shopgirls and Singers
 "I Know What I Am" – Ann Pornick
 "The Party's On the House" – Arthur Kipps, Pearce, Sid Pornick, Buggins, Shopgirls, Singers and Dancers
 "Half a Sixpence" (Reprise) – Arthur Kipps and Ann Pornick
 "All in the Cause of Economy" (Reprise) – Flo, Pearce, Sid Pornick and Buggins
 "Finale" – Entire Company

2016 West End Production 

 Act I
 "Half a Sixpence" – Arthur Kipps and Ann Pornick
 "Look Alive" – Company
 "Money to Burn" – Arthur Kipps, Mr Shalford, Sid Pornick, Buggins, Pierce and Flo
 "Believe in Yourself" – Arthur Kipps and Helen Walsingham
 "She's Too Far Above Me" – Arthur Kipps
 "Money to Burn" (Reprise) – Arthur Kipps and Ann Pornick
 "A Proper Gentleman" – Arthur Kipps, Sid Pornick, Buggins, Pearce and Flo
 "Half a Sixpence" (Reprise) – Arthur Kipps and Ann Pornick
 "Long Ago" – Ann Pornick
 "Back the Right Horse" – Chitterlow and Company
 "Just a Few Little Things" – Helen Walsingham and Arthur Kipps
 "A Little Touch of Happiness" – Ann Pornick and Flo
 "If The Rain's Got to Fall" – Mrs Walsingham, Arthur Kipps, Foster, Helen Walsingham, Lady Punnet and Company

 Act II
 "The One That's Run Away" – Chitterlow & Arthur Kipps
 "Pick Out a Simple Tune" – Arthur Kipps and Ann Pornick
 "You Never Get Anything Right / I Know Who I Am" – Arthur Kipps and Ann Pornick
 "We'll Build a Palace / I Only Want a Little House" – Arthur Kipps, Helen Walsingham, Mrs Walsingham, James Walsingham
 "In the Middle There's Me" – Arthur Kipps, Buggins, Sid Pornick and Pierce
 "Long Ago" (Reprise) – Arthur Kipps and Ann Pornick
 "Flash Bang Wallop" – Arthur Kipps, Ann Pornick, Mr. Shalford, Pearce, Sid Pornick, Buggins, Flo, Photographer and Company
 "Flash Bang Wallop" (Reprise)- Chitterlow, Arthur Kipps, Ann Pornick, Mr. Shalford, Pearce, Sid Pornick, Buggins, Flo, Photographer and Company
 "Finale" – Company

Awards and nominations

Broadway production

2016 West End revival

Recordings
 Half a Sixpence: An Original Cast Recording - Decca SLK4521 (1963)
 Half a Sixpence: The Original Broadway Cast Recording - RCA Victor LOC1110 (1965)
 Half a Sixpence: The Original 1962 Demo Recordings - Stage Door STAGE9052 (2017)

References

External links
 
 Synopsis, musical numbers at guidetomusicaltheatre.com

1963 musicals
adaptations of works by H. G. Wells
British musicals
Broadway musicals
films set in Brighton
musicals based on novels